The Type 41 or Leopard class were a class of anti-aircraft defence frigates built for the Royal Navy (4 ships) and Indian Navy (3 ships) in the 1950s. The Type 41, together with the Type 61 variant introduced diesel propulsion into the Royal Navy, the perceived benefits being long range, low fuel use, reduced crew (especially skilled artificers), and reduced complexity.

Although successful, improvements in traditional steam turbine technology erased the fuel economy advantage of the diesel powerplants and led to production being curtailed in favour of the Type 12 frigate, which was similar in overall design.

Design 
These ships were designed to provide anti-aircraft escorts to convoys and amphibious groups and act as light destroyers on detached duties. They were not intended to operate with fleet carrier task forces which had speeds of over 28 knots and were escorted by destroyers and similar vessels, and therefore made only . They were envisioned in late World War II and immediately after as part of a 1945 project for anti-submarine, anti-aircraft, and Aircraft Direction frigates which would all share a common hull and propulsion, and the design of the Type 41 was completed by December 1947.

Like the 1950 RAN Battle-class variant (actually the Royal Navy variant, for war emergency production) and the unbuilt 1942 two-turret RN G destroyer, which the 1944 common hull escort closely resembles (shipyards building the Type 41, like Dennys Glasgow yard, had been provided with the full 1944 Gallant-class plans), the Type 41 Leopard class used the latest twin semi-auto 4.5" Mk6 turrets. This meant that, unlike other post-war frigates, the Type 41 had a full destroyer armament of two twin 4.5" Mk6 gun turrets, giving them a more powerful armament than the Battle- or Weapon-class destroyers.

The first production orders were in the 1951/2 and 1952/3 programmes. In 1953 eleven additional Type 41s, also with "cat" names like Cougar and Cheetah, were planned, together with ten Type 61 (Salisbury-class) frigates, with which they shared a common hull and machinery.

Distinct from the Type 61, the Type 41 radar fit also supported surface fighting, whereas the radar fit of the Type 61 "Aircraft Direction" (AD) frigates was, when introduced, largely identical to the reconstructed Dido-class AD cruiser Royalist. To that end, HMS Leopard carried navigation radar, the new Type 992 for long-range surface target indication, and the Type 960M for Long Range Air Warning; the Type 61 had four dedicated systems: types 293, 977M, 960M and 982M.

An intended A/S version, the Type 11 (see Type system of the Royal Navy), was cancelled as the low (24-knot) top speed was insufficient for accompanying fast carrier task forces, particularly HMS Eagle, the flagship, commissioned in 1951. However, in practice, frigates and destroyers moving at more than 25 knots create turbulence which blinds their own sonars and can only engage fast-moving subs by using a helicopter with its own sonar. Thus the Type 41s were still fitted with the best late-1950s RN sonars, types 170 and 174 (which remained a good passive sonar into the 1970s), but were equipped with only a minimal A/S mortar battery.

Through their diesel propulsion, the Type 41s achieved long range through their low fuel use. The ships had a total of twelve Admiralty Standard Range Mk.1 (ASR1) diesel engines disposed four-each in three engine rooms. In the fore and aft engine rooms, two engines were connected to the drive shafts by fluid clutches and reduction gearboxes, while the other two were not connected to the shafts, but instead drove 360 kW alternators to provide electrical power. In the centre engine room, all four engines were connected to the shafts. Jaguar was fitted with controllable-pitch propellers. Initially the diesel engines proved somewhat unreliable, but these teething troubles were gradually overcome and reliability eventually became very satisfactory.

The Leopard class was also fitted with an early type of hydraulic stabiliser system consisting of two fins that could be extended outside the main hull, to port and starboard, from a compartment between the two engine rooms. Gyro controlled with a relatively simple control system, they proved very effective in use. During testing every three months at sea, the ship could be easily driven into a 20°+ roll from the manual control on the bridge. Prior warning had to be given over the ship's tannoy system before testing was carried out, to allow stowage of loose items. A slight reduction in top speed was also noticed when in use.

However, by 1955 success had been achieved, with difficulty and limitations, in developing new steam turbines giving 30-knot speed and the range to take convoys across the Atlantic, embodied in the Whitby-class Type 12 frigates. As a result, the orders for the new diesel-electric frigates were cancelled, changed to orders for Type 12, or sold to India.

Within a few years of the Type 41's introduction in the late 1950s they were regarded as obsolete for their intended function as anti-aircraft convoy escorts. This was emphasized when the planned replacement of the 4.5" guns with 3"/70 AA guns was abandoned (in January 1955) due to cost and the view that AA guns were obsolete against jets and missiles. The addition of power-ramming for the twin 4.5" guns, intended to boost the rate of fire from 14rpm to 24rpm, failed. Replacement of the unreliable STAAG 40mm Bofors gun mount by Seacat surface to air missiles was cancelled on economic grounds, and the guns eventually replaced by a single, manually operated Bofors gun. Replacement of the experimental version of the fast rotating 992 target indicators with the slower standard 993 was also abandoned. Only a short range 262 radar MRS1 provided secondary AA fire control for the main armament.

Service 

In service, the Leopard class were used mainly as patrol frigates, notably on the South American station, where their long range and  destroyer-like appearance were particularly advantageous. Operating out of Simonstown naval base in South Africa, they in part replaced the Dido-class cruisers HMS Euryalus and Cleopatra usually deployed on these duties during 1946–1954. It was hoped that a pair of Type 41s  with four twin 4.50inch guns would between them be adequate to deter a single Russian Sverdlov-class cruiser, which British Naval Intelligence saw as having been in part conceived of to threaten trade routes from Buenos Aires to  Britain Later they were extensively used in the Far East during the 1963–68 confrontation with Indonesia over Borneo and Malaysia, for which all-gun-armed Type 41s were again well suited. In the 1970s they saw service on Cod War duties.

In 1972 it was decided not to refit HMS Puma again; purchasing the half-sister of the class, the former Black Star ordered by Ghana, and commissioning it as HMS Mermaid would cost less than the refit. HMS Leopard finished its service in the 1975–1976 Cod War, having given an Icelandic gunboat a 30-second warning that it would open fire with its 4.5-inch guns. HMS Lynx was the last of the class operational and attend the Spithead fleet review in 1977. HMS Jaguar was reactivated from the standby squadron for the Third Cod War, but sprang too many leaks on the voyage to Iceland and returned to Chatham.

HMS Jaguar and HMS Lynx were sold to the Bangladesh Navy in 1978 and March 1982 respectively. Had they been retained a few more years they could have been ideal during the Falklands War for specialized bombardment and the air defence of ships unloading in San Carlos Water. The destroyers and frigates remaining in RN service in 1982 had only one gun turret, the new 4.5 inch Mk.8 often jammed, and those with the Mk.6 twin 4.5 inch (which required 40–45 men required for each turret) rarely even test fired the guns. As it was, the Bangladesh Navy found the Leopard-class satisfactory and the ships were active until they were retired in 2013.

Construction programme

A fifth Royal Navy vessel, HMS Panther was ordered twice.  The first was transferred to India in 1953 before being laid down, a replacement was cancelled in 1957, before being laid down.

Footnotes

References
 
 Gardiner, Robert, Conway's All the World's Fighting Ships 1947–1995 Conway Maritime Press, 1995. 
 Hiranandani G.M,'Transition to Eminence - The Indian Navy 1976 – 90'; pub Lancer, New Delhi 2005, 
 Marriott, Leo, 'Royal Navy Frigates Since 1945', Second Edition, Published by Ian Allan Ltd (Surrey, UK), 1990
 Purvis, M.K., 'Post War RN Frigate and Guided Missile Destroyer Design 1944-1969', Transactions, Royal Institution of Naval Architects (RINA), 1974

Frigate classes
 
Ship classes of the Royal Navy